was a Japanese rakugo comedian known for performing on the Shōten comedy show on Nippon TV.

Born , he used Enraku as his stage name. He was known as a master of the Japanese comic art of rakugo, in which a single performer or storyteller appears on stage and tells comedic stories to the audience.

Enraku was a producer of the Hakata Tenjin Rakugo Matsuri, a rakugo festival held in Fukuoka city from 2007.

On January 25, 2022, Enraku's agency announced that he suffered from a cerebral infarction, further complicated by his ongoing treatment for lung cancer. After his hospitalization, rakugo artists who had a close relationship with Enraku served as guests on Shōten. He died on September 30, 2022, at the age of 72.

References

1950 births
2022 deaths
Rakugoka
Aoyama Gakuin University alumni